is a Japanese comedian from Nishinomiya, Hyogo Prefecture. His real name is Hiroyuki Tanaka (田中 博之) and the screen name's "Shukugawa" derives from the name of a river running through Nishinomiya. As of August 2009, he belongs to the management company ASH & D corporation.

Shukugawa won the 10th place in the R-1 Grand Prix 2008 and the second place in the "Owarai geinin utaga umai ohza ketteisen special" (singing competition for comedians) in August 2009.

Filmography

Film
 The Lines That Define Me (2022), Takiyanagi

Television 
 Beppin-san (2016–17), Kotarō Koyama

References

External links

1979 births
Living people
Japanese comedians
People from Nishinomiya